Jacek Czech (born 29 February 1976) is a Polish Paralympic swimmer who competes in backstroke and freestyle swimming events at international elite events.

Career
He is an eight-time World medalist and a European champion, he has competed at the 2012 and 2016 Summer Paralympics but did not medal in his events. Czech sustained a spinal cord injury after diving headfirst into a lake, he was paralysed in all four limbs however he gained some mobility in his arms through rehabilitation.

References

1976 births
Living people
People from Tarnobrzeg
Paralympic swimmers of Poland
Swimmers at the 2012 Summer Paralympics
Swimmers at the 2016 Summer Paralympics
Medalists at the World Para Swimming Championships
Medalists at the World Para Swimming European Championships
Swimmers at the 2020 Summer Paralympics
Polish male freestyle swimmers
Polish male backstroke swimmers
S2-classified Paralympic swimmers
21st-century Polish people